Gostynin-Włocławek Landscape Park (Gostynińsko-Włocławski Park Krajobrazowy) is a protected area (Landscape Park) in north-central Poland, established in 1979, covering an area of .

The Park is shared between two voivodeships: Kuyavian-Pomeranian Voivodeship and Masovian Voivodeship. Within Kuyavian-Pomeranian Voivodeship it lies in Włocławek County (Gmina Baruchowo, Gmina Kowal, Gmina Włocławek). Within Masovian Voivodeship it lies in Gostynin County (Gmina Gostynin) and Płock County (Gmina Łąck, Gmina Nowy Duninów), between the cities of Włocławek and Płock south of the Vistula.

Within the Landscape Park are 13 nature reserves.

References

Landscape parks in Poland
Parks in Kuyavian-Pomeranian Voivodeship